HMS Albuera ( pennant number I51) was a Royal Navy Battle-class destroyer which was ordered on 10 March 1943 from Vickers Armstrong on the Tyne. She was laid down on 16 September 1943 and launched on 28 August 1945. The order was cancelled on 15 October 1945 and she was sold incomplete for scrapping to Thos. W. Ward arriving at Inverkeithing on 21 November 1950

References

 

Battle-class destroyers of the Royal Navy
Proposed ships of the Royal Navy
1945 ships